Black Maria may refer to:

Art and literature 
Black Mariah (comics), a character in the Luke Cage comics series
Black Maria, a character in the manga series One Piece
Black Maria (novel), a 1991 novel by Diana Wynne Jones
Black Maria, a 1960 anthology of drawings by Charles Addams
Black Maria, a book of poetry by Kevin Young
The Black Maria, a 2016 book of poetry by Aracelis Girmay

Music 
The Black Maria, a Canadian rock band
"Black Maria", a song by Todd Rundgren from the 1972 album Something/Anything?
 "Big Black Mariah", a song by Tom Waits from the 1985 album Rain Dogs

Transportation 
Black Maria (horse), an American racehorse
Black Maria (IFF), a fighter aircraft IFF (identification friend or foe) interrogator
ALCO DL-202-2 and DL-203-2, experimental diesel-electric locomotives known informally as the Black Maria
Black Maria, the airplane flown by Canadian World War I ace Raymond Collishaw
"Black Maria", the first parking meter
Black Maria, an informal nickname for a police van

Card games 
Black Maria (card game)
Black Lady, a card game also sometimes known as Black Maria

Other 
Edison's Black Maria, a film studio created by Thomas Edison
Maria Chernaya, a cavalry commander in the Revolutionary Insurgent Army of Ukraine

See also 
 Maria (disambiguation)
 Black (disambiguation)